Skooled is a Canadian children's educational television series produced by Toronto production company Breakthrough Films & Television and originally broadcast on  TVOntario in Canada, and syndicated to other networks throughout the world. 
The show was filmed at Lakefield College School in Smith-Ennismore-Lakefield, Ontario, near Peterborough.

The second season was filmed with a new cast, including the return of Phil Pallen as vice principal of the school. The second season was filmed at another private boarding school, Trinity College School in Port Hope, Ontario. The "students" of the school were secondary school teachers from all over Ontario.

Show synopsis

Kids will be kids but for eight days five energetic teens get a shot at being adults when they trade places with their teachers in this ultimate role reversal reality show. Over eight days, the adults will learn anything the kids feel is important like Phyz Ed, Issues, Life Skillz, Rock Skool and Psych. But while the adults remember just how hard it can be to be a student, the kids get a taste of their own medicine when they realize there might be more to teaching than they thought.

Domestic and international syndication 
Skooled also airs additionally on several other provincial educational networks in Canada, and in the past, the defunct network BBC Kids.

The program also airs in the United States on the Heroes & Icons network and South Africa's e.tv.

Episodes

Cast 

STUDENTS SEASON 1

Erica
Julian "Whitefro"
Holden
Phil

TEACHERS SEASON 1
Ryan Vickers
Pina Viscomi
Leanne Mladen 
Ben
Rob Sicoli
Faye

STUDENTS SEASON 2

Calvin Rosemond
Dondrea Erauw
Tyler Chavez
Yvonne Su

TEACHERS SEASON 2
Norm
Mari
Jill
Michael
Catherine
Dave
Dan Ewing
Darlene Runnalls

Main crew 
SEASON 1
Producers: Paul Kilback, Ira Levy, Peter Williamson, Kirsten Scollie
Directed by Paul Kilback
Edited by Jay Tipping and David Grout

SEASON 2
Producers: Paul Kilback, Ira Levy, Peter Williamson, Kirsten Scollie
Directed by Paul Kilback
Edited by Jay Tipping and  Peter Watson

Canadian children's education television series
2000s Canadian children's television series
2000s Canadian high school television series
TVO original programming
Television series about teenagers
Television series by 9 Story Media Group